Apport may refer to:

 Apport (paranormal), the paranormal transference or appearance of an object
 Apport (software), a crash reporter for the Ubuntu operating system
 Apport (tribute), a kind of tribute payment in medieval Europe